Lake Izabal, also known as the Golfo Dulce, is the largest lake in Guatemala with a surface area of 589.6 km² (145,693 acres or 227.6 sq mi) and a maximum depth is 18 m (59 ft). The Polochic River is the largest river that drains into the lake.  The lake, which is only a metre above sea level, drains into the Gulf of Honduras of the Caribbean Sea through the smaller Golfete Dulce, which is at sea level, and the navigable Rio Dulce.

The well preserved colonial Castillo de San Felipe de Lara guarded this lake against pirate attacks, and there are some ancient sunken ships nearby.  It is home to several species including the Manatee, Jaguar, Spider Monkey, Blue-eye cichlids, and Howler Monkey, and is a popular place for birdwatching.

Culture 
There are many indigenous communities surrounding the lake, namely the Mayas Q'eqchi'.

The Castle of San Felipe de Lara, constructed in 1652 in honor of Judge Antonio Lara Mangravo, was built to protect the region from pirates.

References

External links 
 Instituto Nacional de Sismología, Vulcanología, Meteorología e Hidrolagía (INSIVUMEH)
Lakes in Guatemala Photo gallery
Lake description 
Guatemalan Fauna Photo gallery

Izabal
Izabal, Lake
Geography of the Izabal Department